Croftburn Farm is a historic farm complex located near Culpeper, Culpeper County, Virginia. The complex includes the contributing Sprinkel-Bushong House (c. 1890–1900); the Cottage (c. 1938); the horse barn (c. 1880); the shop and attached privy (c. 1900); the small barn (c. 1870); the feed room (c. 1870–1880); the large barn (c. 1890); the garage (1920-1930); and the milk shed (c. 1900–1915).

It was listed on the National Register of Historic Places in 2001.

References

Farms on the National Register of Historic Places in Virginia
Houses completed in 1900
Houses in Culpeper County, Virginia
National Register of Historic Places in Culpeper County, Virginia